Div Rud may refer to:
 Div Rud, Rudbar
 Div Rud, Rudsar